Cellulose acetate film, or safety film, is used in photography as a base material for photographic emulsions. It was introduced in the early 20th century by film manufacturers and intended as a safe film base replacement for unstable and highly flammable nitrate film.

Cellulose diacetate film was first created by the German chemists Arthur Eichengrün and Theodore Becker, who patented it under the name Cellit, from a process they devised in 1901 for the direct acetylation of cellulose at a low temperature to prevent its degradation, which permitted the degree of acetylation to be controlled, thereby avoiding total conversion to its triacetate. Cellit was a stable, non-brittle cellulose acetate polymer that could be dissolved in acetone for further processing. A cellulose diacetate film more readily dissolved in acetone was developed by the American chemist George Miles in 1904. Miles's process (partially hydrolysing the polymer) was employed commercially for photographic film in 1909 by Eastman Kodak and the Pathé Frères. Starting with cellulose diacetate, this innovation continued with cellulose acetate propionate and cellulose acetate butyrate in the 1930s, and finally in the late 1940s, cellulose triacetate was introduced, and later polyester bases. These less flammable substitutes for nitrate film were called safety film.

In 1910, a new, patented, non-inflammable, film format 'BOROID' was presented to the British cinematographic trade using acetate-based cellulose. It was developed, he claimed 'accidentally', by the prolific inventor Benno Borzykowski, a partner in Photochemie G.m.b.H. Berlin, and Director of the Benobor Syndicate, who had worked on other patents for artificial silk and other fabrics. BOROID was a by-product of that work. Borzykowski but was not patented. Borzykowski published other UK patents including "Original printed patent application number 21,719 for a new or improved process for the production of a substitute for glass sheets or plates and other articles." in 1910. The Boroid company commenced trading on 21 November 1910, being originally registered in London at 58 Coleman St., moving to 104 High Holborn in May 1911, and finally to 48 Rupert St. in June 1913.
Boroid Ltd. issued its detailed share prospectus in the (Westminster Gazette of Monday 16 January 1911 (P12 col. 1 and 2): A number of testimonials were provided, including a very detailed one from Alfred J West F.R.G.S. of 'Our Navy', in which he proposed to move his entire production to 'non-flam' BOROID film: 'BOROID' had most of its assets in Germany, and the Great War of 1914-1919 put an immediate end to the business in the UK when BOROID film stock became unavailable. A Receiver was appointed by the debenture holders on 12 May 1914 (The London Project). Borzykowski  moved to America and was interviewed in an article in the Educational Film Magazine in the April 1919 edition (p. 22-25. p. 136 in the linked PDF file)

The motion picture industry continued to use cellulose nitrate supports until the introduction of cellulose triacetate in 1948, which met the rigorous safety and performance standards set by the cinematographic industry. The chemical instability of cellulose acetate material, unrecognized at the time of its introduction, has since become a major threat for film archives and collections.

Decay and the "vinegar syndrome" 

Beginning in the 1980s, there was a great deal of focus upon film stability following frequent reports of cellulose triacetate degradation. Cellulose acetate releases acetic acid, the key ingredient in vinegar, which is responsible for its acidic smell. The problem became known as "vinegar syndrome". This accelerates degradation within the film, and can also contribute to damage to surrounding films and metals.

The first instance of cellulose triacetate degradation was reported to the Eastman Kodak Company within a decade of its introduction in 1948. The first report came from the Government of India, whose film materials were stored in hot, humid conditions. It was followed by further reports of degradation from collections stored in similar conditions. These observations resulted in continuing studies in the Kodak laboratories during the 1960s. Film degradation can only be delayed by storage in dry and cold conditions. It was initially thought that storage under recommended conditions might delay decay by 450 years, but some films are developing vinegar syndrome after just 70 years of cold dry storage. Arri and others sold film recorders specifically for recording video onto film for archival purposes based on the assumption that vinegar syndrome could be delayed for long periods of time.

The progression of degradation 
In acetate film, acetyl (CH3CO) groups are attached to long molecular chains of cellulose. With exposure to moisture, heat, or acids, these acetyl groups break from their molecular bonds and acetic acid is released. While the acid is initially released inside the plastic, it gradually diffuses to the surface, causing a characteristic vinegary smell.

The decay process follows this pattern:
 Acetic acid is released during the initial acetate base deterioration, leading to the characteristic vinegar odor. This signal marks the progression of deterioration.
 The plastic film base becomes brittle. This occurs in the advanced stages of deterioration, weakening the film and causing it to shatter with the slightest tension. These physical changes happen because cellulose acetate consists of long chains of repeating units, or polymers. When the acetic acid is released as these groups break off, the acidic environment helps to break the links between units, shortening the polymer chains and leading to brittleness.
 Shrinkage also occurs during this process. With the cellulose acetate polymer chains breaking into smaller pieces, and with their side groups splitting off, the plastic film begins to shrink. In advanced stages of deterioration, shrinkage can be as much as 10%. There have been some reports of film 35mm wide shrinking to almost 17mm.
 As the acetate base shrinks, the gelatin emulsion of the film does not shrink, because it is not undergoing deterioration. The emulsion and film base separate, causing buckling, referred to by archivists as 'channelling.' Sheet films are often severely channelled in the later stages of degradation.
 Crystalline deposits or liquid-filled bubbles appear on the emulsion. These are evidence of plasticizers, additives to the plastic base, becoming incompatible with the film base and oozing out on the surface. This discharge of plasticizers is a sign of advanced degradation.
 In some cases, pink or blue colors appear in some sheet films. This is caused by antihalation dyes, which are normally colorless and incorporated into the gelatin layer. When acetic acid is formed during deterioration, the acidic environment causes the dyes to return to their original pink or blue color.

Testing for degradation 
A testing product developed by the Image Permanence Institute, A-D, or "acid-detection" indicator strips change color from blue through shades of green to yellow with increasing exposure to acid. According to the test User's Guide, they were "created to aid in the preservation of collections of photographic film, including sheet and roll films, cinema film, and microfilm. They provide a nondestructive method of determining the extent of vinegar syndrome in film collections." These tools can be used to determine the extent of damage to a film collection and which steps should be taken to prolong their usability.

Preservation and storage 
Currently there is no practical way of halting or reversing the course of degradation. Many film collectors use camphor tablets but it is not known what the long term effects on the film would be. While there has been significant research regarding various methods of slowing degradation, such as storage in molecular sieves, temperature and moisture are the two key factors affecting the rate of deterioration. According to the Image Permanence Institute, fresh acetate film stored at a temperature of 70 °F (21 °C) and 40% relative humidity will last approximately 50 years before the onset of vinegar syndrome. Reducing the temperature by 15° while maintaining the same level of humidity brings a dramatic improvement: at a temperature of 55 °F (13 °C) and 40% relative humidity, the estimated time until onset of vinegar syndrome is 150 years. A combination of low temperature and low relative humidity represents the optimum storage condition for cellulose acetate base films, with the caveat that relative humidity should not be lowered below 20%, or the film will dry out too much and become brittle.

Cold storage options for the preservation of acetate film range from insulated cold storage rooms, or vaults, with relative humidity control (typical settings in the range of 35–40 °F temperature, and 30–35% relative humidity), which might be used by archival institutions for large and medium-sized collections, to free-standing freezer units, which can be cost-effective for small collections, but necessitate vapor-proof packaging of the films to protect against relative humidity extremes and condensation. Commercial storage facilities may offer varying environmental conditions at different rates.

Microenvironments—the conditions inside an enclosure—can also affect the condition of cellulose acetate film. Enclosures that are breathable or that contain an acid absorbent are instrumental in reducing the rate of decay due to vinegar syndrome. Sealed metal containers can trap the decay products released by the film, promoting the spread of vinegar syndrome.

Rescuing damaged film 
During early stages of decay, the film content can be rescued by transferring it to new film stock. Once the film becomes too brittle or the shrinkage is excessive, it cannot be copied. Because the gelatin emulsion usually stays intact during the degradation process, it is possible to save the image on sheet film using solvents to dissolve the base off the emulsion. Once the emulsion has been freed from the shrunken support, it can be photographed or transferred to a new support. Because of the solvents used, this is a delicate and potentially hazardous procedure and is an expensive process for a large collection. Degraded motion picture film cannot be restored in this way, but sheet films often can.

Digitization is now the best way to preserve the contents of cellulose acetate film. Current standards now allow for scanning at more than ample resolution to produce a copy of the same picture and sound quality as the original. Transfer processes at 10K (pixel) resolution are not uncommon. Transferring is now done without film-damaging sprocket transport, hence, the original film stock suffers little, if any, damage.  The Godfather trilogy is one of the best and earliest examples of full resolution digital transfer and ultimate restoration.  This seminal project was completed several years ago, and the process has significantly improved since then. 

"4K" digital resolution, often available for home viewing, will deliver quality equal to an original analogue 35 mm film. The 10K transfer resolution standard seems to accommodate most, or all 65 mm - 75 mm wide-screen variants.  These film variants were developed in the 1950s and 1960s, (e.g., Spectra-vision, Vista-Vision, CinémaScope, etc.)

Other uses 
Cellulose acetate film is also used to make replicates of materials and biological samples for microscopy. The techniques were developed for metallographic needs to examine the grain structure of polished metals. Replication can be used to understand the distribution, for example, of different types of iron in carbon steel samples, or the fine distribution of damage to a sample subject to mechanical wear.

References

Further reading

External links 
Article on the long term archival of triacetate photographic films
Care, Handling, and Storage of Motion Picture Film, Library of Congress
National Film Preservation Board
UCLA Film and Television Archives
Vinegar Syndrome: An Action Plan, Image Permanence Institute

Cellulose
Photography equipment
Photographic film types